Bimal Dutt   ( 1924 – 04 March 1996) was an Indian filmmaker, film director, Writer  and editor, who directed all-time classics like  Kasturi (1980), and  Protimurti  . He also wrote stories and screenplays.

Death
Dutt  died on March  04, 1996, at his Mumbai residence.

References

External links 
 

1924 births
Film directors from West Bengal
Bengali film directors
Hindi film editors
20th-century Indian film directors
1996 deaths
Indian male screenwriters
Filmfare Awards winners